Lawrence Kirby "Gil" Gallagher (September 5, 1896 – January 6, 1957) was a shortstop in Major League Baseball. He played for the Boston Braves in 1922.

References

External links

1896 births
1957 deaths
Major League Baseball shortstops
Boston Braves players
Baseball players from Washington, D.C.